As part of the sanctions imposed on the Russian Federation as a result of the Russo-Ukrainian War, on September 2, 2022, finance ministers of the G7 group of nations agreed to cap the price of Russian oil and petroleum products in an effort intended to reduce Russia's ability to finance its war on Ukraine while at the same time hoping to curb further increases to the 2021–2022 inflation surge.

In 2022 the Russian Federation was cushioned against oil and gas-based sanction effects because of the world rise in oil and gas prices. The reason for the price cap sanction is to remove the cushion so that the revenue earned by Russia is restricted and will not rise if world oil and gas prices rise in the future. In addition, it will make the hiring of oil tankers much harder for Russia, which will further restrict the amount of oil that Russia can sell and ship to customers, further reducing revenue.

The 2022 Russian crude oil cap would be enforced by a maritime attestation that Russian crude was purchased below a certain set price, irrespective of market conditions. On 3 December 2022, this price cap has been set at USD 60$ per barrel. G-7-based finance companies would only be allowed to provide transport and other services to Russian-based crude under these conditions. Because Russian crude will no longer be imported into Europe as of 5 December 2022, and the U.S. has a complete ban already in place, the controlled purchase of Russian oil would only affect third countries. According to ship-tracking data, ownership and oil transfer (of Russian crude) had already occurred outside territorial waters, thereby creating a challenge for its enforcement.

Flow of Russian oil through pipelines has been exempted from the price capping on which land locked countries like Hungary is mostly dependent on for supply.  

G7 and EU countries intend to duplicate the price cap system over crude oil to provide a price cap on petroleum products from Russia at a later date  and a price cap on natural gas. The price caps on refined oil products and on natural gas came into effect in early 2023.

Discussions on Sanction Proposals 

French Finance Minister Bruno Le Maire said the proposal would require wider international participation to be successful, saying "it should not be a Western measure against Russia, it should be a global measure against war." In response, Russia said it would suspend sales to countries supporting the price cap. Energy analysts have also expressed skepticism that a price cap would be realistic because the coalition is "not broad enough"; OPEC+ called the plan "absurd".  The U.S. and the E.U. will likely attempt to follow through with the plan by limiting Russia's access to Western insurance services. 

In October 2022, India (the world’s third-largest oil importer) announced it would not join the effort to cap the price of Russian oil. India obtains Russian crude at a significant discount, and regards Russia as a strategic, economic partner.

The level of the price cap was discussed at length between the parties to the agreement, the International Working Group on Russian Sanctions at FSI Stanford reported on 28 November 2022 that a price cap of USD75pb would be worse than having no price cap, whereas a price of USD55pb would reduce Russian oil revenue to USD166bn a restriction on finances for the Russian state, before recommending a cap of USD35pb as this would reduce revenue to USD100bn, giving a severe financial change, whilst still leaving the price above the cost of production.

Deputy Prime Minister of Russia, Alexander Novak reported that in 2022 Russian oil production rose 2% to 535m tonnes and that exports rose 7%. Budget revenues from the oil and gas industry grew by 28%, by 2.5 trillion rubles.

The price cap level eventually agreed for the price cap was a balance between the levelling of Russia’s revenue stream without causing a major disruption to global oil markets. It was also important to show Russia that Russia had lost the ability to disrupt the international economic order without facing pushback.

Price Cap price 

The European Union tentatively agreed on 1 December 2022 to set an initial USD60 barrel price cap on Russian seaborne oil with an adjustment mechanism to keep the cap at 5% below the market price, as reported by the International Energy Agency, reviewed every two months. On 2 December 2022 the EU confirmed the price cap rate and joined the US, other G7 countries and Australia in imposing the sanction from 5 December 2022 with two monthly reviews on the level of the price cap.

 5 December 2022 USD 60 per barrel

Price cap review mid January 2023. With Russian Urals oil trading well below the Cap price, reducing Russian revenue, not all countries are willing to undertake the political trading to get agreement on a lower price cap at this time, preferring to wait and see how the cap on refined oil, due to come into effect on 5 February will work. G7 countries have agreed that the next review would be in March 2023 after the refined oil products price cap is set.

Reactions

China 

Whilst China has not joined in the price cap it appears that they are increasing purchases from Russia whilst using the cap to argue for lower prices for future deliveries. The Chinese company COSCO Shipping appears to have pulled out of shipping oil from Far East Russian ports since 5 December where oil shipments have fallen by 50%. A Chinese shipping company believes China could divert up to 18 supertankers and 16 smaller Aframax tankers in 2023 which could transport 110m barrels per annum, being 10% of shipped Russian Urals oil.

Cyprus, Greece and Malta 

Cyprus reported that in two months from the beginning of October 2022, around 20% (900,000 gross tonnes) of their flagged oil tanker fleet have departed, by changing their registry. Higher losses being recorded in Greek and Maltese fleets.

India 

India have rejected the price cap and Russia has offered to help India build oil tankers to enable them to ship Russian oil directly to India, bypassing the sanctions. In December India was buying around one shipload of 1m bpd. During December India increased Russian oil imports, receiving a discount of USD12-15pb which is around USD7pb higher discount than in October, giving a buy price below the price cap. Imports from Russia in 2022 totalled 33.4m tonnes (250m barrels).

Indian importers of Russian crude oil report considerable paperwork is being required to prove that the oil they buy is less than the sanction cap price in order to obtain shipping and insurance facilities.

Japan 

Japan managed to reduce their import of Russian oil by 56%, reducing it to just 1.46% of its oil imports in 2022.

Norway 

On 8 December 2022 Norway announced that it was joining the price cap sanctioning countries.

Russia 

The Kremlin is preparing a presidential decree that will prohibit Russian companies and any traders from selling oil to anyone that participates in a price cap. The decree will also forbid dealings with both companies and countries that join the price-cap mechanism.

With shipping insurance and reinsurance normally coming from Europe or the USA and Lloyd’s syndicates declaring Russian waters a war risk zone, making insurance hard to get and expensive, Russia is seeking to boost acceptance of its own shipping insurance through Russian National Reinsurance Company. 

An experiment in sending one of its three ice-breaking oil tankers to China, sailing through the arctic circle north of Russia, has been tested, the journey is 3,300 miles and will take around 8 weeks.

It is believed that Russia has been purchasing around 100 old (12-15 year) oil tankers to create a "shadow fleet" to circumvent possible sanctions, and paying two to three times the normal price for tankers with ice-class ratings. Russia needs around 240 tankers for its current level of production.

On 4 December 2022 Russia stated that it rejected the price cap of USD60 but would wait before responding to the sanction. Three responses have been suggested, which could become operational at the end of December 2022, a ban on sales to the price Cap participants, (only Japan is still importing ship borne oil from Russia), setting a floor price where Russian producers could not sell crude oil below a pre determined price and thirdly a maximum discount on Russian crude oil compared to the market price of crude oil from other suppliers.

On 27 December 2022 Russia issued a decree applicable from 1 February 2023 until 1 July 2023 which banned the sale of crude oil and finished oil products to any country or company that, directly or indirectly, referred to the price cap in the contract.

Russia announced that its tax on oil production would be based on a $20-25 discount on Brent oil, rather than actual Urals oil prices, which will result in increased tax revenue and equivalent increased costs for producers.

Announced in February 2023 was a reduction in production of 5% (500,000 b/d) as a response to the price caps.

Russian Urals oil price 

October to November 2022 average price for Urals oil was $71.10pb. 

The average price for Russia’s Urals oil blend was $57.49 per barrel between 15 November and 14 December 2022 according to Russia’s Finance Ministry.

Baltic port Urals oil traded on 6 January 2023 at $37.80pb.

The average price for Russia’s Urals oil blend was $46.82 per barrel ($341.8 per ton) between 15 December 2022 and 14 January 2023 per Finance Ministry. Down $10.67 or 18.5%.

The average price for Russia’s Urals oil blend was $50.51 per barrel ($368.7 per ton) between 15 January and 14 February 2023 per Finance Ministry.

Switzerland 

On 8 December 2022 Switzerland joined the EU sanction rules relating to the price cap, followed by the oil product price cap on 15 February 2023.

Turkey 

From 5 December 2022 Turkey demanded proof of full insurance on all tankers proposing to use its straits, to enter or leave the Black Sea, causing a traffic jam of tankers. The temporary holdup was resolved by 12 December.

Ukraine 

Ukrainian president Volodymyr Zelenskyy called the oil cap "a weak position" and not "serious" enough to damage to the Russian economy.

In December 2022 Ukraine provided the International Maritime Organization a list of 30 oil tankers that they believed were involved in ship to ship transfers of Russian oil, risking environment pollution. The tankers flagged by Malta, Greece, Panama and Liberia with some switching-off AIS transponders.

OPEC 

Some OPEC delegates attending an OPEC meeting in Vienna on 4 December 2022 believed that the production of Russian oil could decrease from the current 9.9m bpd by over 1m bpd because of the price cap. The International Energy Agency believes the drop in production could be 1.4m bpd. Some OPEC delegates believe global production should be decreased to force the recent fall in oil prices back to a higher level, whilst others believe a small increase in production could be undertaken to fill the gap left by the predicted fall in Russian production. The OPEC decision was to not change production levels from those set in October 2022.

OPEC production in February 2023 was 28.97m bpd, up 0.15m bpd from January but still 0.88m bpd short of the targeted production.

Operation of sanctions

Trade routes 

Since the onset of war, various sanctions and refusal to trade with a pariah nation much of Russia's liquid petroleum products has been re-routed through terminals at the Baltic terminals Port of Ust-Luga and Port of Primorsk, likely the source for transfers off Ceuta. There are also the Port of Novorossiysk and Tuapse oil terminal on the Black Sea, likely the source for ship-to-ship transfers in the Greek Bay of Lakonikos. Another report places the transfers from Aframax-class vessels to VLCCs bound for China off Gibraltar.

An analyst says "the Russians are just taking a page out of that same book and they're sort of copying what the Iranians and the Venezuelans did" and using a shadow fleet of approximately 250 vessels. The United Arab Emirates is developing as a favoured location for anonymous ship holding companies, as well as Shanghai. Greek shipowners have been doing business with Russians since the 19th century and they intend not to stop. Another report suggests that the Gulf of Lakonikos is a favourite transfer point because it is sheltered and Greek territorial waters extend only to six nautical miles from the shoreline.

Prior to the invasion, the Port of Temryuk in the Sea of Azov was noted as the place of origin of shipments of liquefied petroleum gas (LPG), in the 2019 Kerch Strait liquified gas tanker fire. The Kandy attempted a STS transfer to the Maestro near to the Kerch Bridge in the narrows of the Straits of Kerch and they both caught fire. The STS transfer point was favoured for illicit transfers such as to avoid the Sanctions on Syria.

Several LPG tankers were noticed on 10 March 2023 to have been held up in the waters under the Kerch Bridge "due to security restrictions" for several weeks since December 2022. One source familiar with the trade said it "looks like LPG was added to the list of the dangerous cargos, prohibited from the passage under the bridge". Gazprom and Lukoil were inconvenienced owners of the three ships, or their cargoes. The Port of Temryuk is typically used to deliver LPG cargoes to the Bulgarian Port of Burgas or to the Romanian ports of Port of Mangalia and Port of Midia. The Tengizchevroil company was said to be delivering LPG cargoes to the Georgian Port of Batumi for overseas transfer.

LPG exporters from Russia and Kazakhstan have already diverted their cargoes from Temryuk.

Oil tankers 

Around 55 percent of the tankers that transport Russian oil out of the country are Greek-owned, they will be able to continue operating provided the price cap conditions are met. In December the percentage of Greek-owned ships moving Russian oil fell to 33% with the gap being filled by dark-fleet tankers.

It is believed that Russia has been experimenting with altering a ship transponder to avoid sanctions, with a tanker, the Kapitan Schemilkin giving in May to July 2022 a location near Greece when the tanker was near Malta, satellite imagery was used to prove the false location and identify the tanker's real position.

Ship to ship transfers of crude oil in the Mediterranean hit a record high in January of 1.7m tonnes as smaller tankers transferred their loads to larger vessels for onward transport to the Far East.

The rates than tankers can charge has risen, with a fee of $10.5m to transport 700,000b of crude, sold below the price cap, from the Baltic to India in January, compared to a fee a year earlier of $1m.

By February 2023 around 400 tankers (20% of the world fleet) have changed to transporting Russian oil, leading to a shortage of tankers elsewhere and increasing shipping costs.

EU terms of Oil Price Cap 

The EU introduced rules similar to the USA rules with a 45 day wind down for the regulations and changes to enable ships to comply. EU parties may not deal with any vessel that within the previous 90 days had discharged Russian oil at a price over the cap level. Any price cap changes will require a unanimous decision of the 27 EU Member States comprising the Council.

UK terms of Oil Price Cap 

The Office of Financial Sanctions Implementation (OFSI) is responsible for the sanctions in the UK and Overseas Territories. Crown Dependencies, as well as Bermuda and Gibraltar will legislate themselves. The rules follow those published by the USA and include oil directly shipped from Russia, the transfer of goods between ships and the mixing of loads from different countries.

The permitted maximum monetary penalty is the greater of £1,000,000 or 50% of the estimated value of the breach. A licence can give written permission from OFSI to allow an act that would otherwise breach prohibitions imposed by sanctions.

USA terms of Oil Price Cap 

On 22 November 2022 the Office of Foreign Assets Control (OFAC) in the USA published guidance on the operation of the Price Cap Policy.

A coalition of G7 countries, the European Union and Australia have agreed to prohibit the import of crude oil and petroleum products of Russian origin, supported by a broad range of companies involved in the transport of oil.

The object is to maintain the supply of oil whilst reducing the revenue of the Russian Federation.

US persons will be permitted to undertake services relating to:
 Trading/commodities brokering
 Financing
 Shipping
 Insurance, including reinsurance and protection and indemnity
 Flagging
 Customs brokering
if the oil price is the same as the Price Cap or lower.

Oil loaded before 12:01 am on 5 December 2022 and delivered before 12:01 am 19 January 2022 will be exempt.

Oil cannot be shipped to a jurisdiction that has a ban on the import of oil from the Russian Federation, such as the USA.

Sanctions cease when the oil is landed outside of Russian territory and handed to the purchaser.

Parties undertaking services that facilitate the breaching of the Price Cap will be subject to OFAC penalties.

A flagging jurisdiction is expected to put a vessel involved in a breach of the rules through a de-flagging process.

Safe harbour rules apply to parties involved in permitted actions.

Licences can be requested from OFAC.

The Cap price is set by the Price Cap Coalition.

On 21 December the USA agreed to grant some exemptions, such as if the oil is for humanitarian UN or Red Cross purposes.

Effect of price cap sanctions

December 2022 

The number of sales of oil tankers in 2022 has broken the 2021 levels with buyers for old oil tankers reported in the Middle East, in early December 2022 the charter price of a tanker in the Mediterranean was reported to have risen from 80,000 to USD 130,000 per day if carrying oil from Russia.

In the first week, Russian oil price at Baltic ports was reported as being as low as USD45.10 pb. Seaborne exports also fell by around 500,000 bpd.

Russia's Finance Minister Anton Siluanov said in late December that the effect of the price cap may increase Russia's budget deficit of 2% for 2023.

On 27 December 2022 in response Russia has ordered to ban all oil sales to countries and companies which have agreed on the oil price cap.The ban will start from 1 February 2023 to the next 5 months.

The EU, by 31 December, had reduced their import of Russian oil and oil products by 90% and whilst Russia continues to sell oil to other countries, the price obtained is on average USD30 per barrel less than oil on the global market. This is a material drop in revenue for Russia.

December saw Russia pumping an average of 10.9m b/d  with seaborne oil exports averaged 2.65m b/d a decrease of 14% on November and the lowest month in 2022, with 71% heading to Asia compared to 26% in 2021. 60% of Russian oil transported in December was in tankers controlled by UAE, China, India and Russia, twice previous levels.

January 2023 

The USA believe African countries can benefit from the Price Cap by buying oil from Russia at discounted prices, saving up to USD6 billion p.a.

Russian revenue from oil export duty reportedly fell from USD120m per week to USD47m a week after sanctions came into effect, a fall of 60%.

The Russian Ministry of Finance noted a reduction of export duties on the oil from February; for oil, duty will be $12.8 per ton, from $16.7 in January and $43.3 in December.

Russian Urals oil exports from the Baltic ports of Primorsk and Ust-Luga which had fallen to 4.7m tonnes is expected to rise to 7.1m tonnes in January with 70% going to India.

In the 4 weeks to 27 January, around 1.1m b/d of shipped Russian crude oil was moved by tankers that did not indicate their destination. Malaysia has reported increasing their crude oil sales to China to 1.5m b/d even though Malaysia only produces 400,000 b/d.

The average price for Russian crude oil in January 2023 was $49.48pb down 42% on January 2022 prices and well below the $60pb price cap. The EU estimate that the price cap on Russian oil is costing Russia around 160m euros ($175m) every day ($60b pa). Oil and gas export revenue fell $8b (30%) in January compared to January 2022. Total oil exports amounted to just $13b (down 36% from December sales).

February 2023 
On 10 February Russia announced that in March, Russia will reduce oil production by 500,000 b/d, around 5% of January and February production. Being a drop of 25% in exports from western ports.

The Danish owned "Maersk Magellan" tanker was refused entry into a Spanish port after it had collected a trans shipped load of diesel oil from Vietnamese-flagged product tanker "Elephant" which had acquired it from Cameroon-registered "Nobel" tanker, a ship registered in Russia until 1 July 2022. Three ships have been detained in Europe, Vietnam-flagged "Melogy" and "Elephant" and Liberia-flagged "HS Arge".

Three tankers belonging to Sovcomflot are being de-flagged by Cyprus as they belong to a sanctioned entity.

The Russian Ministry of Finance noted an increase of export duties on the oil from March; for oil, duty will be $14.2 per ton and $4.2 from $3.8 on light oil products, oils and gasoline.

Albania arrested the Russian captain and seized the Liberian registered oil tanker, “Grace Felix”, trying to deliver 22,500 tons of Marine Gasoil 1000 PPM, worth Euro 40million, believed to be Russian fuel transferred ship to ship.

Oil and gas tax revenues fell to $6.9 billion (521 billion Rubles) in February according to Russian Finance Ministry. This is 46% lower than February 2022.

Oil export revenue in February was $11.6 billion, compared to $14.3 billion in January (18% fall) and $20 billion in February 2022 (42% fall).

See also

External links 
, OFAC Guidance on Implementation of the Price Cap Policy

References 

Sanctions and boycotts during the Russo-Ukrainian War
2020s in international relations
Foreign relations of Russia
International sanctions
Sanctions against Russia
Reactions to the 2022 Russian invasion of Ukraine